Widich Nunatak is a nunatak 3.5 nautical miles (6 km) east of Spencer Nunatak, lying between Wisconsin Range and Long Hills in the Horlick Mountains. Mapped by United States Geological Survey (USGS) from surveys and U.S. Navy air photos, 1959–60. Named by Advisory Committee on Antarctic Names (US-ACAN) for George Widich, traverse engineer, Byrd Station winter party, 1960.

Nunataks of Marie Byrd Land